Theodorus Bailey may refer to:

 Theodorus Bailey (politician) (1758–1828), United States senator from New York
 Theodorus Bailey (officer) (1805–1877), naval officer in the U.S. Civil War and the senator's nephew